Henry Colas (fl. 1393) of Guildford, Surrey, was an English politician.

Colas was the son of Henry Colas, MP for Guildford in 1377. He had one son, who was illegitimate.

He was a Member (MP) of the Parliament of England for Guildford in 1393.

References

Year of birth missing
Year of death missing
English MPs 1393
People from Guildford